The New English School, founded in 1969 by Tareq Rajab, is a co-educational British curriculum, English medium, private school in Jabriya, Kuwait, which caters for children between the ages of 3½ and 19.

Standards 
Students at the New English School follow the assessment, grading and examinations of schools in the United Kingdom. This includes International GCSE, Cambridge University and GCE Advanced Levels.
The New English School is a member of the European Council of International Schools (ECIS) and is accredited by British Schools in the Middle East (BSME).
In 2011 the school also achieved British School Overseas status, approved by the UK Government Department for Education and monitored by Ofsted (the official body for inspecting schools). 
(A-Levels), London University, Edexcel.

Facilities 
The school is housed in purpose-built, centrally air-conditioned accommodation for two departments: Secondary and Primary (Junior, Infant and Kindergarten). The Secondary Department consists of 35 classrooms, 11 fully equipped laboratories for physics, chemistry and biology, a number of specialist geography rooms, 4 specialist computer centres, two specialist drama rooms, a specialist music suite, two gymnasiums, various audio-visual resources, a sixth form centre incorporating a study area with networked computers, common room and 2 specialist sixth form teaching rooms, a library containing 20,000 volumes and a Mousetrap Theatre. The Primary Department has 38 classrooms, a library and a specialist music room for each of the Infant and Junior sections and a fully equipped Computer Centre. The school has an all-purpose hall and a fully equipped armchair theatre.

Faculty 
British teachers are recruited from the United Kingdom, Kuwait and other countries.

Relationship with other schools 
Close ties are maintained with the U.K. and with other overseas British and International schools. The school holds memberships in the European Council of International Schools (ECIS) and British Schools in the Middle East (BSME).

Notable alumni
 Rania Al-Yasin, Queen of Jordan since 1999.

References

External links 

Official Website
Review from the Good Schools Guide International

Private schools in Kuwait
British international schools in Kuwait
Educational institutions established in 1969
1969 establishments in Kuwait